Bobby Portis Jr. (born February 10, 1995) is an American professional basketball player for the Milwaukee Bucks of the National Basketball Association (NBA). He played college basketball for the Arkansas Razorbacks, earning consensus second-team All-American honors as a sophomore in 2015. Portis was selected in the first round of the 2015 NBA draft by the Chicago Bulls with the 22nd overall pick. He won an NBA championship with Milwaukee in 2021.

High school career
Portis played high school basketball at Hall High School in Little Rock. He was a highly decorated prep player there, earning McDonald's and  Parade All-American status and was named Mr. Basketball of Arkansas in 2013. Upon committing to Arkansas, Portis became the first in-state McDonald's All-American to sign with the Razorbacks since Corliss Williamson in 1992 and was considered a key recruit for coach Mike Anderson's rebuild of the program.

College career

As a freshman at Arkansas, Portis averaged 12.3 points, 6.8 rebounds and 1.6 blocks per game. He was named to the Southeastern Conference All-Freshman team and second-team All-SEC.

In his sophomore season, Portis was named to the preseason All-SEC team and led the Razorbacks to a top 25 ranking. During his second and final season, Portis averaged 17.5 points, 8.9 rebounds, 1.4 blocks, 1.2 assists, and 1.1 steals per game. He was named one of 20 finalists for the John R. Wooden Award for national college player of the year, one of only two players from the SEC.

On March 10, 2015, Portis was selected as the SEC Player of the Year by the league's coaches. This marks the first time an Arkansas Razorback was selected since Corliss Williamson won the award back-to-back during the 1993–94 and 1994–95 seasons. By that time he was considered one of the top players in college basketball in the 2014–15 season and a likely first-round pick in the 2015 NBA draft.

Professional career

Chicago Bulls (2015–2019)
On June 25, 2015, Portis was selected with the 22nd overall pick in the 2015 NBA draft by the Chicago Bulls. He signed his rookie scale contract with the Bulls on July 7, 2015. In his NBA debut on November 3, 2015, he scored 10 points in the Bulls' 25-point loss to the Charlotte Hornets. Following a quadruple overtime loss to the Detroit Pistons on December 18, 2015, a number of the Bulls' starting five members were fatigued heading into the team's December 19, 2015, game against the New York Knicks. With Jimmy Butler and Tony Snell struggling, Portis capitalized and had the best night of his young career with 20 points and 11 rebounds.

On October 28, 2016, the Bulls exercised their third-year team option on Portis' rookie scale contract, extending the contract through the 2017–18 season. On January 6, 2017, Portis was assigned to the Windy City Bulls, Chicago's D-League affiliate. He was recalled the next day. On February 16, 2017, he had a season-high 19 points in a 104–103 win over the Boston Celtics. On March 2, 2017, he had 17 points and a season-high 13 rebounds in a 94–87 win over the Golden State Warriors. On March 18, 2017, he scored a career-high 22 points in a 95–86 win over the Utah Jazz.

On October 17, 2017, Portis and teammate Nikola Mirotić were engaged in a physical altercation during practice, in which Mirotić charged at Portis, who punched Mirotić in the face, which led to him going to the hospital for a concussion and multiple face fractures. A day later, Portis was suspended by the Bulls for eight games. In his season debut on November 7, Portis had 21 points and 13 rebounds in a 119–114 loss to the Toronto Raptors. On December 11, he scored a career-high 23 points in a 108–85 win over the Boston Celtics. Four days later, he set a new career high with 27 points to go with 12 rebounds in a 115–109 win over the Milwaukee Bucks. On February 22, 2018, he set a new career high with 38 points in a 116–115 loss to the Philadelphia 76ers. On March 17, 2018, he recorded 15 points and a season-high 15 rebounds in a 114–109 loss to the Cleveland Cavaliers.

In the Bulls' season opener on October 18, 2018, Portis had 20 points and 11 rebounds in a 127–108 loss to the Philadelphia 76ers. On October 25, he was ruled out for four-to-six weeks with a moderate sprain of the MCL of his right knee. On December 10, after sitting out nearly seven weeks, Portis returned to the lineup and had nine points in 19 minutes in a 108–89 loss to the Sacramento Kings. On December 20, he was ruled out for two to four weeks with a right ankle sprain, an injury suffered the previous night against the Brooklyn Nets. He returned to action on January 6 against the Nets after missing seven games. On January 30, he scored 22 of his 26 points in the second half of the Bulls' 105–89 win over the Miami Heat.

Washington Wizards (2019)
On February 6, 2019, Portis was traded, along with Jabari Parker and a 2023 second-round pick, to the Washington Wizards in exchange for Otto Porter. He made his debut for the Wizards two days later, scoring a game-high 30 points off the bench in a 119–106 win over the Cleveland Cavaliers.

New York Knicks (2019–2020)
On July 9, 2019, Portis signed with the New York Knicks. Portis became a free agent when the Knicks decided not to exercise the team option on November 19, 2020.

Milwaukee Bucks (2020–present)
On November 26, 2020, Portis signed with the Milwaukee Bucks. On April 29, 2021, Portis scored 10 points, grabbed 11 rebounds, and recorded a career-high 4 steals in a 143–136 overtime loss to the Houston Rockets.

During the 2021 NBA playoffs, in Game 3 of the Eastern Conference Finals on June 27, 2021, facing the Atlanta Hawks, Portis played an important role for the Bucks scoring 15 points, grabbing 4 rebounds, and adding 2 steals in a 113–102 road win. On July 1, 2021 Portis had his first career playoff start against Atlanta in the Eastern Conference Finals in place of an injured Giannis Antetokounmpo. Portis finished with 22 points, 8 rebounds, 3 assists, and 3 steals in 36 minutes in a victory with the crowd frequently chanting "Bobby". After defeating the Hawks 4–2, the Bucks won the 2021 NBA Finals 4–2 over the Phoenix Suns, with Portis scoring 16 points in the deciding Game 6.

On August 6, 2021, Portis re-signed with the Bucks. The contract was worth $9 million over two years and contained a player option for the second year. On November 24, 2021, Portis scored 28 points and grabbed 10 rebounds in a 114-93 victory over the Detroit Pistons. On December 10, 2021, Portis scored 21 points, grabbed 7 rebounds, and blocked 3 shots in a 123-114 victory against the Rockets. Later that month, Portis missed 4 games while in the NBA’s COVID-19 protocols. On February 5, 2022, Portis made six three-pointers and scored a season-high 30 points, in a 137-108 win over the Portland Trail Blazers.

During the first round of the 2022 NBA Playoffs, on April 22, Portis helped the Bucks to a 111-81 Game 3 win over the Chicago Bulls with 18 points and 16 rebounds.

On June 29, 2022, Portis exercised  the second-year player option on his existing contract, becoming an unrestricted free agent. One day later, Portis announced he had re-signed with the Bucks on a four-year contract worth $49 million. This contract was finalized at the beginning of the NBA’s free-agency period on July 6.

On December 3, 2022, Portis scored a game-leading 20 points, grabbed 8 rebounds, and recorded a season-high 7 assists during a 105–96 win over the Charlotte Hornets. On January 25, 2023, it was announced Portis suffered MCL and ankle injuries during a win over the Detroit Pistons, and would be out for at least two weeks. On March 9, Portis scored a season-high 28 points and grabbed 13 rebounds during a 118–113 win over the Brooklyn Nets.

Career statistics

NBA

Regular season

|-
| style="text-align:left;"|
| style="text-align:left;"|Chicago
| 62 || 4 || 17.8 || .427 || .308 || .727 || 5.4 || .8 || .4 || .4 || 7.0
|-
| style="text-align:left;"|
| style="text-align:left;"|Chicago
| 64 || 13 || 15.6 || .488 || .333 || .661 || 4.6 || .5 || .3 || .2 || 6.8
|-
| style="text-align:left;"|
| style="text-align:left;"|Chicago
| 73 || 4 || 22.5 || .471 || .359 || .769 || 6.8 || 1.7 || .7 || .3 || 13.2
|-
| style="text-align:left;"|
| style="text-align:left;"|Chicago
| 22 || 6 || 24.1 || .450 || .375 || .780 || 7.3 || 1.3 || .5 || .4 || 14.1
|-
| style="text-align:left;"|
| style="text-align:left;"|Washington
| 28 || 22 || 27.4 || .440 || .403 || .809 || 8.6 || 1.5 || .9 || .4 || 14.3
|-
| style="text-align:left;"|
| style="text-align:left;"|New York
| 66 || 5 || 21.1 || .450 || .358 || .763 || 5.1 || 1.5 || .5 || .3 || 10.1
|-
| style="text-align:left;background:#afe6ba;"|†
| style="text-align:left;"|Milwaukee
| 66 || 7 || 20.8 || .523 || .471 || .740 || 7.1 || 1.1 || .8 || .4 || 11.4
|-
| style="text-align:left;"|
| style="text-align:left;"|Milwaukee
| 72 || 59 || 28.2 || .479 || .393 || .752 || 9.1 || 1.2 || .7 || .7 || 14.6
|- class="sortbottom"
| style="text-align:center;" colspan="2"|Career
| 453 || 120 || 21.7 || .470 || .383 || .752 || 6.6 || 1.2 || .6 || .4 || 11.1

Playoffs

|-
| style="text-align:left;"| 2017
| style="text-align:left;"| Chicago
| 6 || 0 || 20.1 || .515 || .462 ||  || 6.0 || 1.2 || .5 || .5 || 6.7
|-
| style="text-align:left; background:#afe6ba;"| 2021†
| style="text-align:left;"| Milwaukee
| 20 || 2 || 18.3 || .464 || .346 || .720 || 5.0 || .6 || .7 || .4 || 8.8
|-
| style="text-align:left;"| 2022
| style="text-align:left;"| Milwaukee
| 12 || 5 || 24.8 || .417 || .298 || .773 || 10.0 || .8 || .4 || .3 || 10.6
|- class="sortbottom"
| style="text-align:center;" colspan="2"|Career
| 38 || 7 || 20.6 || .452 || .339 || .745 || 6.7 || .7 || .6 || .3 || 9.0

College

|-
| style="text-align:left;"|2013–14
| style="text-align:left;"|Arkansas
| 34 || 34 || 27.0 || .509 || .273 || .737 || 6.8 || 1.5 || 1.0 || 1.6 || 12.3
|-
| style="text-align:left;"|2014–15
| style="text-align:left;"|Arkansas
| 36 || 36 || 29.9 || .536 || .467 || .737 || 8.9 || 1.2 || 1.1 || 1.4 || 17.5
|- class="sortbottom"
| style="text-align:center;" colspan="2"|Career
| 70 || 70 || 28.5 || .526 || .365 || .737 || 7.9 || 1.3 || 1.1 || 1.5 || 15.0

Personal life
Portis has said, "I talked to God a lot since I was a young child. I followed the path that He lays, and He has blessed me tremendously and helped me get here. I feel like anything that I ask from Him, He gives it to me in some way."

Portis’ foundation, the Bobby Portis Foundation, is a charitable organization that creates programs and initiatives for single mothers in Arkansas.

In October 2022, Portis launched a campaign alongside the Wisconsin Department of Transportation and Milwaukee mayor Cavalier Johnson that aims to lower reckless driving and speeding in Wisconsin.

References

External links

 Arkansas Razorbacks bio
 Bobby Portis pre-draft scouting report

1995 births
Living people
African-American basketball players
All-American college men's basketball players
American men's basketball players
Arkansas Razorbacks men's basketball players
Basketball players from Arkansas
Chicago Bulls draft picks
Chicago Bulls players
Hall High School (Arkansas) alumni
McDonald's High School All-Americans
Milwaukee Bucks players
New York Knicks players
Parade High School All-Americans (boys' basketball)
Power forwards (basketball)
Sportspeople from Little Rock, Arkansas
Washington Wizards players
Windy City Bulls players
21st-century African-American sportspeople